Christian Kouakou Yao (born 1 March 1991) is an Ivorian professional footballer who plays as a forward for Bangladesh Premier League club Bangladesh Police FC.

Career
Born in Abidjan, Kouakou began his career with Toumodi F.C.

In the summer of 2007, he moved to Europe signing a contract with R.S.C. Anderlecht's academy. After three years with the youth teams of Anderlecht, he signed in January 2010 for the Thai side, Muangthong United.

During the mid-season transfer period of the 2010–2011 season, he was linked with the Belgian Premier Division club KV Mechelen.

On 31 August 2016, Kouakou joined Nîmes Olympique from Stade Malherbe Caen on a season-long loan deal. In September 2018, he terminated his contract with Caen.

On 4 July 2019, Gabala FK signed Kouakou to a one-year contract, with the option of a second, from MFK Karviná.

On 2021 Christian Kouakou joined in Bangladesh Police FC. He score his two goals against Dhaka Abahani. He left the club in August 2021 after finishing the season.

In April 2022, he again joined Bangladesh Police FC for second phase of 2021–22 Bangladesh Premier League.

Career statistics

Club

References

External links
 

1991 births
Living people
Footballers from Abidjan
Ivorian footballers
Association football forwards
R.S.C. Anderlecht players
Ivorian expatriate sportspeople in Thailand
Christian Kouakou
Tours FC players
Stade Malherbe Caen players
Nîmes Olympique players
MFK Karviná players
Gabala FC players
Azerbaijan Premier League players
Expatriate footballers in Azerbaijan
Belgian Pro League players
Christian Kouakou
Ligue 2 players
Ligue 1 players
Czech First League players
Ivorian expatriate footballers
Ivorian expatriate sportspeople in Belgium
Ivorian expatriate sportspeople in France
Expatriate footballers in Belgium
Expatriate footballers in Thailand
Expatriate footballers in France
Bangladesh Police FC players